Jack Sadler (born ) is an English professional rugby league footballer who plays as a  or  for the Castleford Tigers in the Betfred Super League.

Background 
Sadler was born in York, North Yorkshire, England.

Sadler played junior rugby league for New Earswick All Blacks ARLFC and Heworth ARLFC.

Career 
On 11 July 2021, Sadler made his Super League début for Castleford against the Salford Red Devils.
Sadler has also featured in Castleford’s 2022 pre season fixture against Doncaster RLFC, converting 3/3 conversions.

On 7 May 2022, Sadler made his League 1 debut on dual registration for the Midlands Hurricanes against Rochdale Hornets

References

External links
Castleford Tigers profile

2002 births
Living people
Castleford Tigers players
Coventry Bears players
English rugby league players
Rugby league hookers
Rugby league players from York